Lancashire County Council is the upper-tier local authority for the non-metropolitan county of Lancashire, England. It consists of 84 councillors. Since the 2017 election, the council has been under Conservative control.

Prior to the 2009 Lancashire County Council election, the county had been under Labour control since 1989.

The leader of the council is Conservative councillor Phillippa Williamson, appointed in May 2021, chairing a cabinet of up to eight councillors. The Chief Executive and Director of Resources is Angie Ridgwell who was appointed in January 2018.

History
The council was established in 1889 under the Local Government Act 1888, covering the administrative county. It was reconstituted under the Local Government Act 1972 with some significant changes to its territory. In 1998 Blackburn with Darwen and Blackpool were both made unitary authorities, making them independent from the county council.

One Connect scandal 
In May 2011 the council's Conservative administration established a partnership with BT Group called One Connect Limited. 40% was owned by the council and 60% by BT. 800 council staff were seconded to it. It was to run various back office functions and it was claimed it would save £400 million over ten years.  In 2014 the partnership was dissolved, though some services were still run by BT. A police investigation followed allegations of corrupt practices and fraud. In May 2017 Conservative councillor Geoff Driver, Phil Halsall, the council's former Chief Executive, David McElhinney, former chief executive of One Connect and its sister organisation Liverpool Connect – and Ged Fitzgerald the current Liverpool City Council chief executive and former Lancashire County Council chief executive were arrested "on suspicion of conspiracy to pervert the course of justice and witness intimidation". As of September 2019 no one has been charged with any offences and it is estimated the Police cost is over £2m.

Administrative organisation
There are two principal tiers of local government within the administrative county of Lancashire, with Lancashire County Council providing county level services and twelve district councils providing district level services.

The prospect of dividing Lancashire into three unitary authorities under one combined authority is currently being discussed, which would see Lancashire County Council and the various district councils abolished.

There are sixteen Parliamentary constituencies in Lancashire. The Conservative Party holds 11, the Labour Party holds four, and the Speaker of the House of Commons, Lindsay Hoyle, represents Chorley.

Composition

Elections are held every four years. At the 2021 election the Conservatives took 48 of the council's 84 seats, retaining the majority they had held since 2017. Labour took 32 seats, the Liberal Democrats 2 seats and the Greens 2 seats. The next election is scheduled to take place in 2025.

Leader and cabinet 

Lancashire County Council is led by the cabinet, which is chaired by the leader of the council, who is elected at the first full council meeting after an election. The current leader of the council is Philippa Williamson, a member of the Conservative Party. The leader appoints up to eight other cabinet members to serve in his or her cabinet.

Future
In July 2020, the county council announced that it wanted to replace itself and the 14 other councils that currently make up Lancashire's complex local government map with three standalone authorities. In September 2020 the county council submitted an outline plan to the government that outlines the proposed new unitary authorities and the areas they would cover. The new authorities would be, Central Lancashire (based on the footprints of Preston, Chorley, South Ribble and West Lancashire councils), North West Lancashire (Blackpool, Fylde, Wyre, Lancaster and Ribble Valley) and East Pennine Lancashire (Blackburn with Darwen, Burnley, Rossendale, Hyndburn and Pendle). These authorities would be governed by an elected mayor, with a combined authority. The major shake up to Lancashire's council structure is in a bid to gain more funding and power for the people of Lancashire.

County Library
Lancashire adopted the Public Libraries Act, 1919, in 1924. Library services were slow to develop as the average ratable value of the area outside the county boroughs and the other local authorities which had already adopted the act was relatively low. In 1938/39 the average expenditure on urban libraries per head was 1s. 9d., but that on county libraries was only 8 1/4d. (about two fifths of the former amount). Another disadvantage was that government of libraries was by a libraries sub-committee of the education committee of the council (the librarian having to report to the education officer who might not have been sympathetic to libraries). The central administration of the county library is at Preston where there are special services, special collections and staff to maintain a union catalogue.

Biological heritage sites

"Biological heritage sites" are, according to Lancashire County Council, "'local wildlife sites' in Lancashire...(that) are identified using a set of published guidelines." The published guidelines dictate the necessary parameters in which a piece of land can be properly considered a "biological heritage site" by the "(Lancashire) County Council, Wildlife Trust for Lancashire, Manchester and North Merseyside and Natural England."

Notable members
Richard Kay-Shuttleworth, 2nd Baron Shuttleworth (1937–1940), a fighter pilot killed in the Battle of Britain

References

External links
 Lancashire County Council

 
Local government in Lancashire
County councils of England
1889 establishments in England
Local education authorities in England
Local authorities in Lancashire
Major precepting authorities in England
Leader and cabinet executives